Allá te espero (Wait for Me) is a 2013 Colombian telenovela produced and aired by RCN Televisión.

Cast 
Mónica Gómez - Rosa María Restrepo Jaramillo
Keller Wortham - David Schroeder
Sebastián Martínez - Alex Montoya
Alejandra Borrero - Magnolia Jaramillo de Restrepo
Carlos Benjumea - Nazario Restrepo
Valentina Rendón - Cecilia Restrepo Jaramillo
Ana Wills - Sarah Visbal Schroeder
Andrea Guzmán - Berenice Ortiz
Luis Fernando Salas - Leonardo †
Ilja Rosendahl - Thomas
Diego Sarmiento - Jose
Ana María Estupiñán - Juana "Juanita" Salazar Restrepo
Javier Ramírez - Francisco Javier "Pacho" Salazar Restrepo †
Carmenza Gómez - Rubiela Jaramillo
Patrick Delmas - Phillipe
Elkin Díaz - Félix Cascavita
Juan Pablo Franco - Aurelio Salazar
Juan Sebastián Parada - Michael Montoya Restrepo
Lincoln Palomeque - Javier Linero
Morella Zuleta - Norma
Iván López - Samuel Fernández
Cristina Campuzano - Amelia Patiño
Carlos Camacho - Guido Ramírez
Carlos Manuel Vesga - Álvaro Jaramillo
Javier Gnecco - Gabriel Fernández
Alberto Pujol - Silvio
Humberto Dorado - Guillermo Visbal
Bebsabe Duque - Maribel Rondón
Gloria Zapata - Leonor de Visbal
Jeimy Paola Vargas - Dora
Maria Vanedi - María Guadalupe "Lupe" Aguilar
Joavany Alvarez - Luis †
Giancarlo Mendoza - Nicolás Cascavita †
Adriana Silva - Paola
 Rodrigo Brand - Rilh
Juan Luís Abisambra - Martín
Guillermo Blanco - Danilo
Rodolfo Valdés - René
Alejandro Martínez - Jerónimo Castillo
Diego León Hoyos - Israel †
Alberto Saavedra - Don Picasso/Octavio Jaramillo †
Ana Lucia Silva- Susana
Sandra Monica Cubillos - Marina
Ramsés Ramos - Omar Hernández

International broadcasts 
 United States: MundoFox
 : MundoFox
 : TC Televisión
 : El Trece 
 : NEXtv
 : ATV
 : Venevisión
 : VTV
 : Bolivisión
 : Antena Latina
 : DStv

References

External links 
  
 

2013 telenovelas
Colombian telenovelas
2013 Colombian television series debuts
2013 Colombian television series endings
RCN Televisión telenovelas
Spanish-language telenovelas
Television shows set in New York City
Television shows set in Bogotá